Little Falls is an unincorporated community located in the town of Alden, Polk County, Wisconsin, United States. The Apple River flows through Little Falls and was once dammed where County Road C now crosses the river.

References

Unincorporated communities in Polk County, Wisconsin
Unincorporated communities in Wisconsin